Curtis Clark (born 23 April 1950) is a jazz pianist from Chicago, United States.

Clark was born in Chicago, Illinois in 1950, but moved to Los Angeles where he spent his student years and started composing and playing the piano. After Clark graduated in music theory and composition from the California Institute of Arts in Valencia, he set out for New York City. There he began working and recording with David Murray.

Influenced by Miles Davis, Duke Ellington, Horace Tapscott, Thelonious Monk and John Coltrane, Clark was based in Amsterdam for many years until his return to the U.S. He is now situated in New England.

While working with various groups, Clark has played with musicians including Oscar Brown, Jr., Julian Priester, Art Taylor, Billy Bang, Richard Davis, Abbey Lincoln, Charles Tyler, John Tchicai and Han Bennink.

He was a National Patron of Delta Omicron, an international professional music fraternity.

Discography

As leader
 Dedications (1981, Freelance)
 Phantasmagoria (1984, Nimbus )
 Reach, Believe & Play (1984–85, Nimbus )
 Self Trait (1985, FMP)
 Deep Sea Diver (1985, Nimbus)
 Amsterdam Sunshine (1987, Nimbus)
 Letter to South Africa (c. 1987, Nimbus)
 Live at the Bimhuis (1988, Nimbus)
 Dreams Deferred (1993, Nimbus)
 Taagi (2010, NoBusiness)

As sideman
With Billy Bang
 Invitation (Soul Note, 1982)
With M. Cook
 Trance (1979, Circle)
With Julian Priester
 Polarization (ECM, 1977)
With J. C. Tans
 Around the World (1989, BVHaast)

References 

 

1950 births
American jazz pianists
American male pianists
Living people
20th-century American pianists
21st-century American pianists
20th-century American male musicians
21st-century American male musicians
American male jazz musicians
NoBusiness Records artists